Pierre Cottier (born 15 May 1908, date of death unknown) was a Swiss weightlifter. He competed in the men's light heavyweight event at the 1936 Summer Olympics.

References

1908 births
Year of death missing
Swiss male weightlifters
Olympic weightlifters of Switzerland
Weightlifters at the 1936 Summer Olympics
Place of birth missing